My Left Breast is a Canadian documentary film, directed by Gerry Rogers and released in 2000. Starring Rogers and her partner Peg Norman, the film documents Rogers' experience being diagnosed with and treated for breast cancer.

The film was screened theatrically at selected documentary and LGBT film festivals in Canada and the United States, but was distributed primarily as an episode of the CBC Television documentary series The Passionate Eye. Rogers' tour to promote the film included an appearance on The Rosie O'Donnell Show in December 2000.

Awards
The film won the award for Best Canadian Documentary at the 2001 Hot Docs Canadian International Documentary Festival, the award for Best Canadian Film at the 2001 Inside Out Film and Video Festival, and the Gemini Award for Best History/Biography Documentary Program at the 16th Gemini Awards in 2001.

The film also won awards from the Dallas OUT TAKES Lesbian and Gay Film Festival and the Boulder Gay and Lesbian Film Festival in 2001 and 2002.

See also
List of LGBT films directed by women

References

External links
 

2000 films
English-language Canadian films
Canadian documentary films
Documentary films about cancer
Breast cancer
Films shot in Newfoundland and Labrador
2000 documentary films
Canadian LGBT-related films
2000 LGBT-related films
Documentary films about lesbians
2000s English-language films
2000s Canadian films